The 1997 NAIA Men's Division I Basketball Tournament was held in March at Mabee Center in Tulsa, Oklahoma. The 60th annual NAIA basketball tournament featured 32 teams playing in a single-elimination format.

Awards and honors
Leading scorers: 
Leading rebounder: 
Player of the Year: Juergen Malbeck (Hawaii Pacific).

1997 NAIA bracket

  * denotes overtime.

See also
1997 NAIA Division I women's basketball tournament
1997 NCAA Division I men's basketball tournament
1997 NCAA Division II men's basketball tournament
1997 NCAA Division III men's basketball tournament
1997 NAIA Division II men's basketball tournament

References

Tournament
NAIA Men's Basketball Championship
NAIA Division I men's basketball tournament
NAIA Division I men's basketball tournament